Signs of the Decline is the third album by Massacra. It was released in 1992. The re-release contains six tracks from the Sick album as bonus.

Reception

Eduardo Rivadavia of AllMusic said that Massacra took a step backwards from their previous studio album Enjoy the Violence.

Track listing
  "Evidence of Abominations"   – 4:00  
  "Defying Man's Creation"  – 3:39  
  "Baptized in Decadence"  – 4:28  
  "Mortify their Flesh"  – 4:01  
  "Traumatic Paralyzed Mind"  – 3:56  
  "Excruciating Commands"  – 3:48  
  "Worlds Dies Screaming"  – 3:22  
  "Signs of the Decline"  – 4:01  
  "Civilisation in Regression"  – 4:04  
  "Full Frontal Assault"  – 4:27

Personnel
Jean-Marc Tristani - Guitars
Fred Duval - Guitars, Vocals
Pascal Jorgensen - Vocals, Bass
Matthias Limmer - Drums

References

1992 albums
Massacra albums
Vertigo Records albums